The Department of Management Studies, IIT Madras, also known as DoMS, IIT Madras is a business school under the Indian Institute of Technology Madras in Chennai, India.

History 
IIT Madras was established in 1959. The Department of Humanities and Social Sciences at IIT Madras offered management education in the form of M. Tech. (Industrial Engineering) from 1959 . A  MBA program was started by the department in 2001. The Department of Management Studies came into existence in April 2004.

Programs
The department offers MBA, PGPEX-VLM, MS, and PhD degrees.

MBA
The MBA programme is a two-year programme, structured with courses spread over seven quarters and about five to six courses per quarter. The first year contains core courses that are compulsory for all students, whereas the second year mostly has electives and a few core courses. In the summer break between the first and second year, students work on a summer project with a company.

Apart from regular academics, course activities include taking courses on audit, field visits, participating in management workshops, organizing professional events, and working on live business projects. The programme includes three core courses on Industrial and Business Domains spread over the last three quarters.

Students of the programme can opt for auditing courses (i.e. taking classes but not assignments or exams and not receiving credits) from any of the elective courses offered by the Department of Management Studies or from the more than 300 courses offered by the other 14 departments in the institute.

Co-curricular courses offered at the department include business communication and presentation skills, negotiation skills, teamwork and conflict resolution skills, time management, business etiquette, and foreign languages (primarily German).

The batch size is in the range of 60 to 70 students, picked from over 250,000 applicants who take up the Common Admission Test (CAT) conducted by the Indian Institutes of Management followed by a Group Task/Personal interview session later on. Until 2011 admission was based on the Joint Management Entrance Test conducted by the IITs and Indian Institute of Science in rotation. From the academic year 2012 JMET is replaced with the Common Admission Test.

PGPEX-VLM
Postgraduate programme for executives For visionary leadership in manufacturing (PGPEX-VLM) is a year-long joint programme of IIM Calcutta, IIT Kanpur and IIT Madras.

It is an initiative of the National Manufacturing Competitiveness Council, government of India, for career development/advancement of engineers/ executives with work experience. The PGPEX-VLM programme was designed by the IIM Calcutta, IIT Kanpur and IIT Madras in consultation with industry, the Confederation of Indian Industry, the Japanese International Cooperation Agency (JICA), NMCC and MHRD. The government of Japan extends cooperation to support transfer of Japanese expertise and visit to manufacturing centers of excellence in Japan for the PGPEX-VLM Programmes, through JICA.

Selection of candidates is made on the basis of academic background, which has to be first division/first class from school (SLC/ Madhyamik) board examination level to graduation level, relevant work experience, employer’s recommendations, performance in the aptitude test and personal interview conducted jointly by IIMC, IITK and IITM. For self sponsored candidates a minimum of  four and half years to a maximum of ten years of work experience in manufacturing and related sector is mandatory. For sponsored candidates, the upper limit on maximum experience of 10 years is waived. Approximate batch size is 35-40.

MS
DoMS IIT Madras offers two categories of the MS program:
 Master of Science (by Research) is characterized by a research component in the curriculum. MS prepares the student in conducting managerially relevant research in areas of management.
 Master of Science (by Entrepreneurship) exposes the students to opportunities in entrepreneurship and requires them to design and test the commercial viability of products/processes or business models and services that could be eventually commercialized.

Ph.D in Management
In research it is ranked as top public Bschool in India.  Prof Rajendran C. It is ranked 15th among the top 20 h-index POM (production & operation management) researchers in last 50 years (1959-2008) in the world with an h-index of 21. Another faculty member Dr. Arshinder Kaur received highly commended Emerald/EFMD Doctoral Awards 2008 for her doctoral thesis in Logistics and supply chain management category. In terms of research productivity in production and operations management area Indian Institute of Technology has been ranked in the top 20 institutes in the world.

Doctoral research at DoMS IIT Madras has won international awards and funding. In 2007 Dr. Sandhya Shekhar's doctoral thesis won Emerald/EFMD Outstanding Doctoral Research Award in Knowledge Management category. In 2011, Dr. K. Gopalakrishnan's doctoral thesis and Dr. Priya Nair's doctoral thesis were highly commended Emerald/EFMD Doctoral Awards 2011 in "Knowledge Management" and "Management & Governance" category respectively. In 2009, doctoral student Arti Kalro won "Emerald/AIMA Indian Management Research Fund Award" for the theme "Understanding and addressing cataract-related eye care issues in rural Tamil Nadu".

The department offers PhD in finance, general management, HR and OB, marketing, operations, strategic management, systems and IT management, and technology management area. The requirements for PhD admission are:
 A master's degree in an eligible discipline with a good academic record
 Qualification in CAT/AIMA/GATE/UGC-NET JRF or Lectureship or equivalent.
 Candidates with at least five years managerial experience are also eligible in lieu of the qualifying test.

Extracurricular
 DoMS Day Out, is an intra-departmental sporting event held every year during March–April.
 DoMS Cricket League. In Feb, 2011 the 5th edition of DCL (DCL 5.0) was conducted. Unlike the normal cricket formats each team has only seven players (five males + two girls compulsory)+ one substitute player.

Other activities include the Teacher's Day event, Hostel Day event, industrial visits, class trips and Outbound at Dawn.

Events

Samanvay
Samanvay is the annual National Business School Fest of the IIT Madras. It is organized by students of MBA at Department of Management Studies. Each year Samanvay revolves around a theme. Samanvay 2010 was inaugurated by Mr K. Ananth Krishnan, Chief Technology Officer, Tata Consultancy Services. Some of the recurring events are business plan contest, panel discussion by industry experts, online quizzing and events on finance, marketing, operations, HR and consulting.

ICON
ICON or Inter-Corporate Outbound National Championship is a sporting event organized by DoMS, IITM for the corporate community. Teams spanning the country are pitted against each other to demonstrate their teamwork and leadership skills in a fun-filled informal way.

Student initiatives and interfaces
Some of them are listed below.
shmi Narayanan (CEO & President, Cognizant Technologies Solutions)

CEO Connect
In CEO connect business leaders are invited to the campus, to share their experiences. The essence of the event is to provide the students an opportunity to get a perspective from the captains of the industry.

Corporate Wisdom
Managers are invited for lectures and workshops.

Management Insights for Social Transformation (MIST)
Management Insights for Social Transformation (MIST) is a forum in the department which invites philanthropists, who have reached out to the society, to share their experiences and enrich the students in their attitude towards the society.

MBA Invitational Lecture Series (MILS)
Started in 2011, the Invitation Lecture Series initiative is a lecture event.

DoMS Interface (DI)
DoMS INTERFACE is an initiative to develop a forum whose objective is to be a program communication link to the outside world which includes corporate world, prospective students, alumni and media.

Collaborations

Mannheim Business School, Germany 
The department has a Memorandum of Understanding with Mannheim Business School Germany for exchange of students and faculty. The students at either universities do courses from the other for a semester.

Indian School of Business
In November 2007, DoMS IIT Madras &  The Indian School of Business (ISB) inked a pact for collaborative research.

Other MOUs for Student Exchange
The institute supports collaboration between other universities at the national and international level. DoMS involves itself by facilitating student and faculty exchange programs across universities. Other universities and organizations DoMS has an MoU with are:

 Deggendorf University of Applied Sciences, Germany
 European Business School, Wiesbaden, Germany
 Hof University of Applied Sciences, Germany
 Indian School of Business, Hyderabad
 Karlsruhe Institute of Technology, Germany
 Kyushu University, Fukuoka, Japan
 Management Centre, Innsbruck, Austria
 RWTH Aachen University, Germany
 Sauder Business School, University of British Columbia, Canada
 Seoul National University, Korea
 T U Hamburg, Germany
 Technical University of Munich, Germany
 Technische  Universität Darmstadt, Germany
 University of Bremen, Germany
 University of Duisburg-Essen, Germany
 University of Passau, Germany

References

External links
 Website
 Department of Management Studies IIT Madras Interfaces
 Student  blog.
  SAMANVAY - The annual B-school festival
 Research collaboration with ISB, Hyderabad.
 Inter-Corporate Outbound National Championship

Indian Institute of Technology Madras
Business schools in Chennai
University departments in India
2004 establishments in Tamil Nadu